The Afro-Asian Games were the series of inter-continental multi-sport competitions, held between athletes from Asia and Africa. These Games are one-of-a-kind, since no other sporting competition brings athletes from these two continents together for one event, excluding the Olympic Games. These Games are supposed to be held once every four years. They are jointly supervised by the Olympic Council of Asia (OCA), and the Association of National Olympic Committees of Africa (ANOCA).

The Afro-Asian Games witness the participation of Asian and African National Olympic Committees (NOCs), along with a few Commonwealth Games Federation (CGF) nations.  The Inaugural Afro-Asian Games were held in 2003 in Hyderabad, India.

Cancellation
Algiers, Algeria was "ready" to host the second Afro-Asian Games, scheduled to be held from July to August, 2007.  However, the Games were indefinitely postponed. The President of the Association of National Olympic Committees of Africa (ANOCA), Lassana Palenfo, said that:

It is impossible for us to host the Afro-Asian Games, as the Asians have failed to line up their gold medallists.

List of Afro-Asian Games

References 

 
Recurring sporting events established in 2003
Defunct multi-sport events